Nes is a rural locality (a selo) in Zapolyarny District, Nenets Autonomous Okrug, Russia. It had a population of 1,368 as of 2010, a decrease from its population of 1,446 in 2002.

Geography
Nes is located about 280 km southwest of Naryan-Mar and about 85 km northeast of Mezen, in the southern portion of the Kanin Peninsula. It is situated on the eponymous River Nes, about 12 km inland. Nes is barely north of the Arctic Circle.

History
The settlement first appeared as a fishing settlement in the second half of the 18th century. By the 1830s, the village had seven farmsteads. Its Orthodox church was built in 1831, but burned down 26 years later, in 1857.

Transport
There is no road to Nes, so the only way to get to the village is from the airport, where there is a flight to Naryan-Mar.

Climate
Nes has a subarctic climate (Dfc).

References 

Rural localities in Nenets Autonomous Okrug